Éxitos En Vivo may refer to:

 Éxitos En Vivo (La Mafia album), 1995
 Éxitos En Vivo (A.B. Quintanilla album), 2014